Lim Yin Loo (born 24 September 1988) is a Malaysian professional badminton player. She was part of the national team that won the gold medal at the 2014 Commonwealth Games in Glasgow, Scotland. Lim won her first BWF Grand Prix title at the 2016 Scottish Open in the women's doubles event partnered with Yap Cheng Wen.

Achievements

BWF Grand Prix (1 title) 
The BWF Grand Prix has two levels, the Grand Prix and Grand Prix Gold. It is a series of badminton tournaments sanctioned by the Badminton World Federation (BWF) since 2007.

Women's doubles

  BWF Grand Prix Gold tournament
  BWF Grand Prix tournament

BWF International Challenge/Series/Satellite (3 titles, 4 runners-up) 
Women's doubles

Mixed doubles

  BWF International Challenge tournament
  BWF International Series/ Satellite tournament
  BWF Future Series tournament

References

External links 
 

1988 births
Living people
People from Negeri Sembilan
Malaysian sportspeople of Chinese descent
Malaysian female badminton players
Badminton players at the 2010 Asian Games
Badminton players at the 2014 Asian Games
Asian Games competitors for Malaysia
Badminton players at the 2014 Commonwealth Games
Commonwealth Games gold medallists for Malaysia
Commonwealth Games medallists in badminton
Competitors at the 2011 Southeast Asian Games
Competitors at the 2013 Southeast Asian Games
Southeast Asian Games bronze medalists for Malaysia
Southeast Asian Games medalists in badminton
21st-century Malaysian women
Medallists at the 2014 Commonwealth Games